Sarah Allan (born 1945) is an American paleographer and scholar of ancient China. She was a Burlington Northern Foundation Professor of Asian Studies in the Department of Asian and Middle Eastern Languages and Literatures at Dartmouth College; she is currently affiliated to the University of California, Berkeley. She is Chair for the Society for the Study of Early China and Editor of Early China. Previously, she was Senior Lecturer in Chinese at the School of Oriental and African Studies at the University of London. She is best known for her interdisciplinary approach to the mythological and philosophical systems of early Chinese civilization.

Biography
Allan received a B.A. degree in 1966 from the University of California, Los Angeles, and her M.A. and Ph.D. degrees in 1969 and 1974 respectively from the University of California, Berkeley. At UCLA, she studied archaeology with Richard C. Rudolph and took a course in Chinese art history with J. Leroy Davidson, and she studied under Peter A. Boodberg and Wolfram Eberhard at Berkeley. She has published widely in English and Chinese (as Ai Lan 艾兰).

In her work, Allan has presented an attempt to reconstruct the basic concepts of the mythology of China's Shang dynasty based on evidence from a number of sources, including Shang inscriptions (primarily from oracle bones, as well as bronzes), myths and stories recorded during the Zhou and Han dynasties that followed the Shang, which appear to be derived from Shang sources, as well as archaeological data. Her works have been translated into both Chinese and Korean. Her most recent book is Buried Ideas: Legends of Abdication and Ideal Government in Recently Discovered Early Chinese Bamboo-slip Manuscripts (SUNY Press, 2015), which discusses four Warring States period (475-221 BCE) bamboo-slip texts about Yao's abdication to Shun, centering on issues of meritocracy and hereditary succession.

Allan has also collaborated extensively with Chinese scholars, Li Xueqin 李学勤 and Qi Wenxin 齐文心 in particular, in publishing Chinese materials in Western collections in order to make them available to scholars in China. Another area of collaboration is her organization of international conferences and workshops on Chinese excavated texts.

For a time, Allan was Senior Lecturer in Chinese at the School of Oriental and African Studies at the University of London. Until 2019, she was Burlington Northern Foundation Professor of Asian Studies in the Department of Asian and Middle Eastern Languages and Literatures at Dartmouth College. She currently resides in California. She is Chair for the Society for the Study of Early China and Editor of Early China.

Allan was married to the artist Nicol Allan, who died in 2019.

Selected works

Monographs

Collaborative works 

 
 
 
 Vol. 1 (1985)
 Vol. 2 (1992)

Articles

Works translated into Chinese 

 
  - translated by Wang Tao

Edited volumes

References

American sinologists
Academics of SOAS University of London
Dartmouth College faculty
Living people
American women historians
1945 births
University of California, Berkeley alumni
University of California, Los Angeles alumni
21st-century American historians
Women orientalists
American women non-fiction writers
21st-century American women